The 2001 European Junior Badminton Championships were the 17th tournament of the European Junior Badminton Championships. They were held in Spała, Poland, from 7–14 April 2001.

Medalists

Boys' singles

Seeds 

 1.  Eric Pang (champion)
 2.  Jens-Kristian Leth (quarterfinals)
 3/4.  Joachim Persson (final)
 3/4.  Nathan Rice (quarterfinals)

 5/8.  Sergey Ivlev (semifinals)
 5/8.  Rune Ulsing (second round)
 5/8.  Gijs van Heijster (quarterfinals)
 5/8.  Marc Zwiebler (quarterfinals)

Finals

Girls' singles

Seeds 

 1.  Petra Overzier (semifinals)
 2.  Juliane Schenk (champion)
 3/4.  Kamila Augustyn (final)
 3/4.  Petya Nedelcheva (semifinals)

 5/8.  Nadieżda Kostiuczyk (quarterfinals)
 5/8.  Mie Nielsen (second round)
 5/8.  Amalie Dynnes Ørsted (quarterfinals)
 5/8.  Anastasia Russkikh (quarterfinals)

Finals

Boys' doubles

Seeds 

 1.  Rasmus Andersen / Carsten Mogensen (champion)
 2.  James Boxall / Steven Higgins  (semifinals)
 3/4.  Erwin Kehlhoffner / Maxime Siegle (quarterfinals)
 3/4.  Jan Junker / Marc Zwiebler (semifinals)

 5/8.  Peter Hasbak / Rune Ulsing (final)
 5/8.  Tuomas Karhula / Petri Hyyryläinen (quarterfinals)
 5/8.  Youri Lapré / Gijs van Heijster (quarterfinals)
 5/8.  Sergey Ivlev / Sergey Lunev (quarterfinals)

Finals

Girls' doubles

Seeds 

 1.  Kamila Augustyn /  Nadieżda Kostiuczyk (champion)
 2.  Carina Mette / Juliane Schenk  (final)
 3/4.  Mie Nielsen / Amalie Dynnes Ørsted (quarterfinals)
 3/4.  Anastasia Russkikh / Elena Shimko (semifinals)

 5/8.  Maya Ivanova / Petya Nedelcheva (semifinals)
 5/8.  Lena Frier Kristiansen / Kamilla Rytter Juhl (third round)
 5/8.  Birgit Overzier / Petra Overzier (quarterfinals)
 5/8.  Agnieszka Jaskuła / Paulina Matusewicz (quarterfinals)

Finals

Mixed doubles

Seeds 

 1.  Rasmus Andersen / Mette Nielsen (champion)
 2.  Marc Zwiebler / Birgit Overzier  (semifinals)
 3/4.  Carsten Mogensen / Kamilla Rytter Juhl (final)
 3/4.  Sergey Lunev / Anastasia Russkikh (quarterfinals)

 5/8.  James Boxall / Katie Litherland (quarterfinals)
 5/8.  Erwin Kehlhoffner / Perrine Le Buhanic (withdrawn)
 5/8.  Youri Lapré / Silvana de Boer (quarterfinals)
 5/8.  Paweł Lenkiewicz /  Nadieżda Kostiuczyk (third round)

Finals

References

External links 
 Badminton Europe: European Junior Championships-Individual results
Badminton Europe: European Junior Team Championships

European Junior Badminton Championships
European Junior Badminton Championships
European Junior Badminton Championships
European Junior Badminton Championships
International sports competitions hosted by Poland